Stubbers Green Bog is a 3.0 hectare (7.4 acre) biological site of Special Scientific Interest at Stubbers Green, in the West Midlands, England. Following a public campaign in 1985, the site was notified in 1986 under the Wildlife and Countryside Act 1981 and is currently managed by Walsall Council.

A 1939 drawing, Stubbers Green Pool, Walsall Wood, by Theodore Garman, is in the Garman Ryan Collection at The New Art Gallery Walsall.

See also
List of Sites of Special Scientific Interest in the West Midlands
Stubbers WildLife

References
 Stubbers Green Bog English Nature. Retrieved on 2008-05-24

Sites of Special Scientific Interest notified in 1986
Sites of Special Scientific Interest in the West Midlands (county)